Lionel (Leo) Beaumaurice Clarke  (1 December 1892 – 19 October 1916) was a Canadian recipient of the Victoria Cross, the highest and most prestigious award for gallantry in the face of the enemy that can be awarded to British and Commonwealth forces.

Early life
Clarke was born on the 5th Concession Road (Con 5 - Lot 10), near Waterdown, Ontario. He spent his early years in England, home of his parents, but later returned and settled in Winnipeg, Manitoba in about 1903. When World War I started, he was working as a surveyor for the Canadian Northern Railway in the Canadian north. He returned to Winnipeg to enlist in the 27th Battalion, and after arriving in England in June 1915, transferred to the 2nd (Eastern Ontario Regiment) Battalion, Canadian Expeditionary Force to be with his brother, Charles.

Victoria Cross
The main assault of the Battle of Flers-Courcelette was scheduled for September 15, 1916. Its objective was to occupy a chain of trenches between Martinpuich and Courcelette. On 1 September 1916, Clarke's battalion was charged with capturing a 50-yard-long salient between the Canadian position at Mouquet Farm and Courcelette to the north.

As recounted in the London Gazette at the time. on 9 September 1916, near Pozières, France, the first three companies of Clarke's battalion went over the top, leaving the fourth in reserve. Clarke, an Acting Corporal at the time, was assigned to take a section to clear the enemy on the left flank to allow his company sergeant to build a fortified dugout that would secure the Canadian position once the salient was overrun. When his section reached the trench, it was so heavily defended that they had to battle their way through with hand grenades, bayonets and their rifles as clubs. Clarke was the only man left standing; the rest had either been killed or wounded.

At that time, about 20 Germans, including two officers, counter-attacked. Clarke advanced, emptying his revolver into their ranks. He then picked up two enemy rifles and fired those too. One of the officers attacked with a bayonet, wounding Clarke in the leg, but Clarke shot him dead. The Germans retreated, but Clarke pursued, shooting four more and capturing a fifth. In all, Clarke killed 19 of the enemy, capturing one.

Variations as Reported in the London Gazette
The account reported in the London Gazette was a somewhat 'polished' account for several reasons and differed from the actual experiences related by Leo to his brother Charles (Charlie) Clarke while recuperating shortly after the events of 9 September 1916.

As a corporal, Acting Private Leo Clarke was not permitted to have, wear, or use a side-arm, however he won a Colt Model 1905 Marine Corps and 2 extra clips from a group of U.S. soldiers in a card game. As this sidearm was neither of British Expeditionary Force (World War I) issue, nor sanctioned for use by infantrymen - yet played a pivotal role in the events, it was neither referenced officially not represented correctly in the tinplate engraving which accompanied the Gazette article - it was represented as a Webley Revolver (a British weapon). That the Colt Model 1905 Marine Corps was known for jamming may or may not have been a factor as it did not jam for Acting Corporal Clarke.

As well, the account in the London Gazette had Acting Corporal Clarke 'advancing' however per Clarke's recounting to his brother, he held his position in the trench and while bracing himself against the side (as he still had a bayonet through his thigh), Clarke took steady aim and shot them dead one by one as the enemy rounded a turn some distance away - claiming one life for each of the 21 shots in his clip. It was once his pistol was empty, he picked up a German rifle and proceeded down the trench and after making the turn where the Germans had come, he found several soldiers, a Sargent, and an officer. He commanded them to surrender but the officer ordered the men to fight. Leo shot him dead and the remaining soldiers surrendered. It was only after he returned to his own lines with the prisoners that he - and his prisoners - discovered that the rifle Leo used was actually empty.

According to his brother Charles (Charlie) Clarke, the actions of the day - and the shooting one by one of the soldiers with the side arm troubled Leo deeply - so the London Gazette account wasn't challenged but contributed to Leo's lack of enthusiasm for the honour.

Charles (Charlie) Clarke completed an unpublished memoir (still in the hands of the Clarke family) which was a key contributor to the book "Valour Road'.

Death

On 11 October 1916, Clarke's battalion was ordered forward to secure the newly captured Regina Trench which was still under heavy enemy artillery fire. Clarke was crouching in a hole at the rear of a trench when a shell exploded and the back of the trench caved in, burying him. His brother dug him out, but Clarke was paralyzed; the weight of the earth had crushed his back and injured his spine. Clarke was taken to No. 1 General Hospital, but died on 19 October. He is buried in Plot II, Row C, Grave 3A, in Etretat Churchyard Extension, 16 miles north of Le Havre, France. According to a contemporary newspaper article, shortly before his death he wrote his parents, stating: "I don't care so much for the Victoria Cross as getting home for a couple of months."

Legacy
Clarke was posthumously awarded the Victoria Cross in February 1917. Clarke’s father, Harry, received his son’s VC at a presentation at the corner of Portage and Main in Winnipeg. The medal was a simple bronze cross stamped with the motto “For Valour.” For the first time, Canada’s Duke of Devonshire (Governor General of Canada), travelled to make a personal presentation of the award at a ceremony attended by about 30,000 people. Harry Clarke also received a letter from King George V, commending his son for his courageous actions.

In 1925, Pine Street in West End, Winnipeg, was renamed "Valour Road" in honour of Clarke and fellow Victoria Cross winners Frederick William Hall and Robert Shankland, all of whom lived on the 700 block.

A plaque in his honour was erected by the Ontario Heritage Foundation at the Royal Canadian Legion branch in Waterdown.

Clarke's story was featured in a Heritage Minutes vignette, which was run nationally in Canada.

The legacy of remembrance continues in the Clarke family as Charles (Charlie) Clarke (brother of Leo Clarke VC) named his eldest son Lionel after his late brother and the family has continued to honour this memory with the great-nephew and great-great nephew carrying this name as well.

In 2010, the eldest son of Charles (Charlie) Clarke (nephew and namesake Leo Charles Clarke), with the full support of the family, donated the Victoria Cross - as well as the Colt Model 1905 Marine Corps sidearm to the Canadian War Museum. This was donated in memory of both his Uncle Leo and his father Charles (Charlie) Clarke.

By 2014, the museum had acquired all three Valour Road medals Victoria Cross and they are now on permanent display at the Canadian War Museum in Ottawa, Ontario Canada.

References

Further reading 
"Flamboro Boy Winner of the Victoria Cross" – Hamilton Spectator, October 27, 1916, p. 1
Monuments to Courage (David Harvey, 1999)
Scotland's Forgotten Valour (Graham Ross, 1995)
The Register of the Victoria Cross (This England, 1997)
VCs of the First World War - The Somme (Gerald Gliddon, 1994)

External links
 Leo Clarke digitized service file
 Historica vignette
 Legion Magazine article on Leo Clarke
 
  Ontario Historic Plaque

1892 births
1916 deaths
Canadian Battle of the Somme recipients of the Victoria Cross
Canadian World War I recipients of the Victoria Cross
People from Hamilton, Ontario
Canadian people of English descent
Canadian military personnel killed in World War I
Canadian Expeditionary Force soldiers
Burials in Etretat Churchyard
Canadian military personnel from Ontario
Canadian Army soldiers
Governor General's Foot Guards